The Galleria d'Arte Moderna of Bologna is the modern art museum of the city. The collections consist of more than 3,500 items of modern and contemporary art.

History

The gallery was founded in 1925, in the Villa delle Rose, a building donated to the City of Bologna by Countess Nerina Armandi Avogli. The collection was re-ordered in 1936. Soon, thanks to many acquisitions and bequests, the collection grew large and by 1961 had already reached more than 2,000 items.

In 1975 some works were transferred to a new building, designed by Leone Pancaldi, in the Fair district.

On 5 May 2007 the new venue for modern and contemporary art was inaugurated in the former bakery in Don Minzoni street (in the new cultural district Manifattura delle Arti).

See also
List of museums in Italy

References

External links

Art museums and galleries in Bologna
Contemporary art galleries in Italy
Modern art museums in Italy
Art galleries established in 1925
Art museums established in 1925
1925 establishments in Italy